This is a list of aviation-related events from 2012.

Deadliest crash
The deadliest crash of this year was Dana Air Flight 992, a McDonnell Douglas MD-80 which crashed in Lagos, Nigeria on 3 June, killing all 153 people on board, as well as six on the ground.

Events

January
7 January
 A hot air balloon on a scenic flight disintegrates and crashes just north of Carterton, New Zealand, killing all 11 people on board. It is the second-deadliest balloon accident in history, the deadliest aviation accident in mainland New Zealand since July 1963, and the deadliest accident involving a New Zealand aircraft since November 1979.
In the Syrian Civil War, Colonel Afeef Mahmoud Suleima of the Syrian Armys aviation logistics division defects along with at least 50 of his men, ordering his men to protect protesters in the Syrian city of Hama from government forces.

9 January
 The European Union declares the financial aid Malév Hungarian Airlines receives from the Government of Hungary to be illegal. The European Commission soon orders the airline to pay back all of the subsidies it received from the Hungarian government between 2007 and 2010, a total of 38 billion forints (€130 million; $171 million), an amount equal to its entire 2010 revenue.

10 January
 Greater Londons Metropolitan Police Service launches a Twitter account for its helicopter force, allowing people to remain aware of the helicopters activities. The police hope the service will cut down on the number of noise complaints they receive about their helicopter operations.

14 January
 After the completion of a seven-year restoration project, the only flyable Lockheed Super Constellation at the time, a retired 57-year-old ex-United States Air Force EC-121 Warning Star airborne early warning radar surveillance aircraft, makes a 90-minute flight from Camarillo, California, to Chino, California, to go on display at the Yanks Air Museum in Chino.

20 January
 Cirrus Airlines ceases flight operations.

25 January

27 January
 Spanair ceases operations.

February
3 February
 After creditors seize two of its airliners at foreign airports and with total debts of 60 billion forints (US$270.5 million), Malév Hungarian Airlines ceases flight operations after 66 years in business.

4 February
Australian filmmaker Andrew Wight is at the controls of his private Robinson R44 helicopter with American filmmaker Mike deGruy as a passenger for a flight to scout filming locations when the helicopter crashes on takeoff and burns at Jaspers Brush near Berry in New South Wales, Australia. Both men are killed.

5 February
MatlinPatterson, the private equity firm in control of World Airways and North American Airlines, takes its Global Aviation Holdings subsidiary carriers into Chapter 11 bankruptcy reorganization less than four years after shuttering fellow subsidiary carriers ATA Airlines and Arrow Air.

7 February
 AirQuarius Aviation ceases operations.

12 February
 A Katanga Express Gulfstream IV crashes while landing at Kavumu Airport at Bukavu, Democratic Republic of the Congo, killing four of the seven people on board and two people on the ground and prompting the Congolese government to suspend Katanga Expresss license.

14 February
 The Metropolitan Court of Budapest in Hungary declares MALÉV Ltd., the parent company of Malév Hungarian Airlines, insolvent. The airline's assets will be liquidated.

March
 AirAsia Philippines begins flight operations, using a fleet of two new Airbus A320-200 aircraft.
 All air traffic in Bucharest, Romania, except for business air traffic is transferred from Bucharest's low-cost hub, Aurel Vlaicu International Airport, to Bucharest Henri Coandă International Airport.
2 March
 The last departure of an official Continental Airlines flight takes place at 11:59 pm Pacific Standard Time as Continental Flight 1267 departs Phoenix, Arizona, bound for Cleveland, Ohio. On 3 March, Continental Airlines disappears into United Airlines, completing the two airlines 2010 merger. Continental had operated since 1934.

3 March
 The Continental Connection and Continental Express airline brands disappear as all Continental Connection and Continental Express operations become a part of United Express.

6 March
 Turkish Airlines begins twice-a-week service from Istanbul, Turkey, via Khartoum, Sudan, to Mogadishu, Somalia, becoming the first major airline from outside East Africa to offer passenger service to Mogadishu in over 20 years. Deputy Prime Minister of Turkey Bekir Bozdağ is aboard the first flight.

15 March
 A Royal Norwegian Air Force C-130J Super Hercules crashes into Mount Kebnekaise, killing all five people on board and triggering an avalanche.

21 March
 The Government of Ukraine establishes the National Bureau of Air Accidents Investigation of Ukraine.

23 March
 A Syrian Army attack helicopter pilot ordered to kill anti-government protesters instead fires all of his ammunition at a government military building in Aleppo and then defects, flying his helicopter to Turkey.

27 March
 Aboard JetBlue Airways Flight 191, an Airbus A320-200 flying from John F. Kennedy International Airport in New York, New York, to McCarran International Airport in Las Vegas, Nevada, the copilot locks Captain Clayton Osbon out of the cockpit after Osbon begins acting erratically, apparently suffering from a panic attack. Passengers subdue Osbon, and the airliner diverts to Amarillo, Texas, where Osbon is arrested.

April
2 April
UTair Flight 120, a twin-engine UTair Aviation ATR-72-201, crashes in western Siberia near the city of Tyumen shortly after takeoff from Roschino International Airport, killing 31 of the 43 people on board and critically injuring all 12 survivors.

4 April
An inexperienced military contractor operating an unarmed United States Air Force MQ-9 Reaper unmanned aerial vehicle by remote control mistakenly makes the Reaper take off without permission from Seychelles International Airport on Mahé in the Seychelles, accidentally commands the Reapers engine to shut down a minute later without realizing it, then forgets to put down the landing gear as he attempts an emergency landing at the airport. The Reaper bounces on the runway and crashes into the Indian Ocean along the edge of the airport six minutes after takeoff.

6 April
Outdoor Channel fishing show host Jose Wejebe is killed when the Comp Air 8-SF Exp he is piloting crash-lands in a field and bursts into flames just after takeoff from Everglades City, Florida.

12 April 
 A Bell UH-1H Huey II of the National Police of Peru is shot down during Operación Libertad, a campaign by Peruvian police and armed forces and police against drug producers and smugglers in the Apurímac and Ene valleys. The copilot and one passenger are killed.
17 April
A Shuttle Carrier Aircraft, accompanied by a National Aeronautics and Space Administration (NASA) T-38 Talon chase plane, carries the retired Space Shuttle Discovery from the Kennedy Space Center at Cape Canaveral, Florida, to Washington Dulles International Airport in Dulles, Virginia, where Discovery is slated to replace the Space Shuttle Enterprise on display at the Smithsonian Institutions nearby Steven F. Udvar-Hazy Center, a part of the National Air and Space Museum.

19 April
Slovenian pilot Matevž Lenarčič returns to Slovenia, completing a 62,000-mile (99,839-km) round-the-world flight in a Pipistrel Virus SW914 ultralight aircraft, claiming to be the first person to circle the world in an ultralight without a copilot.

20 April
Bhoja Air Flight 213, a Boeing 737-236, crashes in bad weather on approach to Benazir Bhutto International Airport at Islamabad, Pakistan, killing all 127 people on board.

24 April
 The United States Air Force inactivates the Seventeenth Air Force.

26 April
 A Kamov Ka-26 helicopter crashes in Tulcea County, Romania, killing all five Ukrainians on board.

27 April
 A Shuttle Carrier Aircraft, accompanied by a National Aeronautics and Space Administration (NASA) T-38 Talon chase plane, carries the Space Shuttle Enterprise from Washington Dulles International Airport in Dulles, Virginia, to John F. Kennedy International Airport in New York City, making low-level flybys of New York City-area and Long Island landmarks. Enterprise, replaced by the Space Shuttle Discovery at the Smithsonian Institution National Air and Space Museums Steven F. Udvar-Hazy Center in Virginia, is to be placed on display at the Intrepid Sea, Air & Space Museum in New York.
 A team of scientists and engineers stages an experimental crash of the Boeing 727-200 XB-MNP in a desert near Mexicali, Mexico. The crash is filmed for a television documentary. It is only the second such experiment in history, the only previous one having been the 1984 Controlled Impact Demonstration.

May 
6 May
 An American unmanned aerial vehicle strike in eastern Yemen kills Fahd al-Quso, the al-Qaeda leader in Yemen, wanted in connection with the 12 October 2000 bomb attack on the U.S. Navy guided-missile destroyer .

9 May
 A Sukhoi Superjet 100 airliner crashes on Mount Salak on Java in Indonesia during a demonstration flight for airline representatives and journalists, killing all 45 people on board. Its wreckage is discovered on 10 May.

10 May
 The womens international record-holder for number of flight hours logged as a pilot in a lifetime, Evelyn Bryan Johnson, dies at the age of 102. Only one person, Ed Long (1915-1999), had logged more hours (over 65,000, or about 7 years) in the air during a lifetime.

14 May
 After aborting its landing at Jomsom Airport at Jomsom, Nepal, a Dornier 228 AG-CHT crashes when its wing strikes a hillside while attempting a go-around, killing 15 of the 21 people on board and injuring all six survivors. Indian child actress Taruni Sachdev is among the dead.

23 May
Using a wingsuit in a jump over Ridge Wood, Buckinghamshire, England, British stuntman Gary Connery becomes the first person in history to jump from a great height and land safely without deploying a parachute.

24 May
 Speaking to the British House of Commons in London, Brigadier General Aqil Hashem, a former senior Syrian Army officer who has defected to the rebel side in the Syrian Civil War, suggests international intervention, perhaps including air strikes by unmanned aerial vehicles, is needed to stop what he calls the genocide the Syrian Army is committing in Syria.

25 May
The first Solar Impulse aircraft, HB-SIA, the first solar-powered aircraft capable of both day and night flight thanks to its batteries charged by solar power, completes the first leg of its first intercontinental flight, arriving at Madrid, Spain, after a flight from Payerne Airport outside Payerne, Switzerland. The second and final leg of the flight will take HB-SIA to Rabat, Morocco, the following month.

26 May
 Japanese wingsuit pilot Shin Ito achieves two new world wingsuit flight records, greatest horizontal distance flown in a wingsuit by flying  and greatest absolute distance flown in a wingsuit by flying . Both flights take place above Yolo County, California.

June
 During the month, the World Birdstrike Association (WBA) officially is formed as the successor to the International Bird Strike Committee. Headquartered in the Netherlands, the WBA coordinates information about bird strikes among countries.
2 June
 Allied Air Flight 111, a Boeing 727 cargo plane, overruns the runway on landing at Kotoka International Airport in Accra, Ghana, and strikes a crowded minibus and a bicyclist on a nearby road. All four people on the plane survive, but the bicyclist and all 11 people on the minibus die.
3 June
 On approach to a landing at Lagos, Nigeria, the crew of Dana Air Flight 992, a McDonnell Douglas MD-83, reports engine trouble and declares an emergency. Shortly thereafter, the aircraft crashes into a furniture works and printing press building in the Iju-Ishaga neighborhood of Lagos, killing all 153 people aboard and ten people on the ground. Additional people on the ground are injured. It is the second-deadliest plane crash in Nigerian history and the deadliest ever involving an MD-83.
4 June
 An American unmanned aerial vehicle strike in Pakistan kills Abu Yahya al-Libi, a leading al-Qaeda official.
 After a Libyan militia force takes control of part of Tripoli International Airport in Tripoli, and demands the release of a kidnapped militia leader, a gun battle breaks out between the militiamen and Libyan government forces. Government authorities arrest 30 militiamen.
5 June
The first Solar Impulse aircraft, HB-SIA, the first solar-powered aircraft capable of both day and night flight thanks to its batteries charged by solar power, completes its first intercontinental flight, arriving at Rabat, Morocco, after a 19-hour flight across the Strait of Gibraltar from Madrid, Spain. The flight is the second and final leg of its intercontinental trip, which had begun on 25 May with a flight from its home base at Payerne Airport outside Payerne, Switzerland, to Madrid.

7 June
 Kenyan helicopters attack Al Shabaab positions in Kismayo, Somalia.
10 June
 The Free Syrian Army reports that Syrian government attack helicopters have helped drive its forces out of the government air defense base at Al-Ghantu, which they had briefly captured.
 A Kenya Police Eurocopter AS350 Écureuil crashes on a hill in the Kibiku area of the Ngong Forest just outside Nairobi, Kenya, killing all six people on board. Among the fatalities are Kenyas Minister of Interior Security and likely presidential candidate George Saitoti and Assistant Minister of Interior Security Joshua Orwa Ojode.
11 June
 The United Nations confirms for the first time that Syrian government helicopters have begun firing on rebel forces.
21 June
 An Indonesian Air Force Fokker 27 on a training flight crashes into a housing complex while on approach to a landing at Jakarta, Indonesia. Six of the seven people on the plane die immediately, and the seventh dies later of his injuries. On the ground, four people die and 11 are injured.
Syrian Air Force MiG-21 (NATO reporting name "Fishbed") fighter pilot Colonel Hassan Hamada defects with his plane to Jordan. Jordan will later grant him political asylum.
22 June
Syrian antiaircraft fire shoots down a Turkish Air Force F-4 Phantom II fighter on a training mission over the Mediterranean Sea off Turkeys Hatay Province, killing its two-man crew. Syria claims the aircraft violated its airspace; Turkey admits a momentary violation but claims the F-4 was shot down 15 minutes later in international airspace 13 nautical miles (15 statute miles; 24 km) from Syria.
23 June
Three Syrian Army pilots defect, crossing the border into Jordan.
25 June
Turkey accuses Syria of firing at a second Turkish Air Force plane while it is searching for crew of the F-4 Phantom II shot down on 22 June.
28 June
 The U.S. military announces that wreckage revealed by a retreating glacier in Alaska and discovered during June 2012 is that of a U.S. Air Force C-124A Globemaster II which crashed into Mount Gannett on 22 November 1952, killing all 52 people on board. Originally identified on 28 November 1952, the wreckage had become buried in ice and snow and had been lost for nearly 60 years.

29 June
 Six Uyghur men armed with aluminum crutches and explosives attempt to hijack Tianjin Airlines Flight 7554, an Embraer ERJ-190 on a flight from Hotan to Ürümqi, China, with 95 other people aboard. The crew and other passengers resist them and foil the hijacking attempt. Two hijackers are killed and 13 people (two hijackers, two security officers, two flight attendants, and seven passengers) are injured, and the plane returns safely to Hotan.
30 June
 Eighty-four percent of U.S. domestic airline flights have arrived within 15 minutes of their scheduled arrival time since 1 January, their best on-time performance since the United States Government began tracking their on-time performance in 1988 and an improvement from 77 percent between 1 and 30 January June 2011. They also set a record-low rate of baggage handling mistakes, misdirecting, damaging, or losing only three suitcases per 1,000 passengers on domestic flights between 1 and 30 January June 2012.

July
1 July
 Lauda Air, a wholly owned subsidiary of Austrian Airlines since December 2000, officially merges into Austrian Airlines, with all Lauda Air aircraft transferred to Austrian Airlines on the same date. However, Austrian Airlines will continue to operate some of its flights under the "Lauda Air" brand until 31 March 2013.

4 July
The Turkish armed forces announce that they have begun an effort to recover the bodies.

5 July
 Facing mounting financial difficulties and with its employees having gone on strike two days earlier, the Uruguayan airline PLUNA ceases operations. Its owner, the Government of Uruguay, announces plans to auction off PLUNA's aircraft and routes.

7 July
 A video is released showing Syrian rebels claiming to have shot down a Syrian government surveillance aircraft and showing pieces of the aircraft. It is the first time that Syrian rebels have claimed to have shot down a government aircraft.

13 July
 The United States Air Force inactivates the Nineteenth Air Force. It will remain inactive until October 2014.

24 July
 The Syrian Air Force attacks rebels for the first time in the Syrian Civil War, when MiG-23s (NATO reporting name "Flogger") bomb eastern areas of Aleppo.

26 July
 Indonesia AirAsia announces a plan to buy out Batavia Air by 2013 in a two-stage process. The deal will be cancelled in October.
 Syrian government Mil Mi-25 (NATO reporting name "Hind") attack helicopters strike rebel positions in eastern Aleppo.

28 July
 Attack helicopters support a Syrian government tank attack against Free Syrian Army positions in Aleppo.

31 July
 Belarus fires its chiefs of air defense and of the border guards because of the illegal 4 July flight into the country by a Jodel biplane.
 Due to confusion among air traffic controllers at Ronald Reagan Washington National Airport in Arlington, Virginia, two USAirways commuter jets take off into the path of a third USAirways commuter jet flying in the opposite direction and cleared to land on the same runway. Realizing their error, controllers order the inbound aircraft to take evasive action 12 seconds before it would have collided with the leading outbound jet. There are no injuries among the 192 people on the three aircraft.

August
1 August
 The first incarnation of AirAsia Japan, a joint venture of Malaysian airline AirAsia and Japanese airline All Nippon Airways makes its first flight, flying between Tokyo's Narita International Airport and Fukuoka. This version of AirAsia Japan will operate until October 2013.
 In the Syrian Civil War, United Nations observers see Syrian Air Force jets bombing rebel-held districts in the Salheddine area of Aleppo.

5 August
 An Israeli airstrike halts an attempt by a group of gunmen to use commandeered Egyptian armored vehicles to ram their way through an Israeli border crossing from Egypt into Israel.

7–8 August (overnight)
 Egyptian Air Force aircraft strike militants at Sheikh Zuweid on Egypts Sinai Peninsula. It is the first Egyptian airstrike in the Sinai Peninsula since the Yom Kippur War in October 1973.

12 August
 The airline Wind Jet ceases operations after Alitalias attempt to purchase it fails, leaving hundred of passengers stranded in Italy.
13 August
An Internet video is released showing the crash of what appears to be a Syrian Air Force MiG-23 (NATO reporting name "Flogger") aircraft flying over Muhasan, Syria. Syrian rebels claim to have shot it down.

14 August
 An unmanned experimental United States Air Force X-51A Waverider hypersonic aircraft launched from above the Point Mugu Naval Air Test Range in California goes out of control because of a fault in one of its control fins and crashes into the Pacific Ocean 15 seconds into its flight and before igniting its scramjet engine. The crash leaves only one surviving Waverider out of the four constructed.

15 August
 A Syrian Air Force strike hits a hospital in Aleppo, Syria, wounding one person. Human Rights Watch calls the attack a violation of international law.

18 August
 Suffering engine trouble, an Aviatour Air Piper PA-34-200 Seneca I crashes in the sea off Masbate in the Philippines, killing three of the four people on board and injuring the lone survivor. Among the dead is Philippine Secretary of the Interior Jesse Robredo, whose body will be recovered from the sea on 21 August.

19 August
 An Alfa Airlines Antonov An-26-100 carrying a Sudanese government delegation to an Eid al-Fitr festival crashes in the mountains around Talodi in the state of South Kordofan in southern Sudan, killing all 32 people on board. Among the dead are Sudans Minister of Religious Affairs Ghazi al-Sadiq, Minister for Youth and Sports Mahjoub Abdel Raheem Toutou, and Minister for Tourism, Antiquities, and Wildlife Eissa Daifallah, several members of the Sudanese Armed Forces and state security service, and a state media television crew.

21 August
 Afghan insurgents fire rockets at Bagram Airfield in Afghanistan, damaging the Boeing C-17 Globemaster III of United States Chairman of the Joint Chiefs of Staff General Martin Dempsey while Dempsey is in his quarters on the base. The damage forces Dempsey to use a different aircraft when he departs Afghanistan later in the day.

23 August
The Syrian Air Force makes heavy strikes against rebel forces attacking Syrian government positions in Abu Kamal.
Caught in a sudden thunderstorm, a hot-air balloon carrying tourists on a sightseeing trip attempts an emergency landing in Slovenias Ljubljana Marsh, but strikes trees, crashes, and catches fire. Four of the 32 people on board are killed and the remainder are injured.

25 August
Neil Armstrong – American astronaut, aerospace engineer, test pilot, and university professor, U.S. Navy pilot, and the first person to walk on the Moon – dies in Cincinnati, Ohio, at the age of 82.

26 August
 Syrian rebels claim to have shot down a Syrian government attack helicopter, possibly a Mil Mi-24 (NATO reporting name "Hind").
 After a final flight from Denver, Colorado, to Lihue, Kaua'i, Hawaii, 83-year-old Ron Akana retires as the longest-serving flight attendant in history. His career, all with United Airlines, had spanned 63 years since he joined the airline in 1949, interrupted only by two years of military service from 1951 to 1953. He had flown about 200 million miles (322,000,000 km) and made about 10,000 trips over the Pacific Ocean.

28 August
The University of Marylands Gamera II sets a flight endurance record for a human-powered helicopter, remaining aloft for 65.1 seconds.

29 August
 Syrian rebels claim to have attacked a Syrian government military air base in Taftanaz, Syria, damaging several government helicopters.

30 August
 Human Rights Watch alleges that in the previous three weeks Syrian government airstrikes and artillery fire have struck at least 10 bakeries in Aleppo as people lined up to collect bread, killing dozens, with one attack on 16 August alone killing 60 and injuring 70 people.

31 August
 Syrian rebels target government air bases, claiming to be trying to reduce the threat of air attacks on their forces. They reportedly shoot down a government helicopter in Sarmin, Syria.
 The Free Syria Army warns airlines to suspend service to Damascus and Aleppo, Syria, saying rebel forces could begin attacking airports in the two cities as early as the following week.
 Richard Bach, author of the best-selling 1970 novel Jonathan Livingston Seagull, is badly injured in the crash of his Easton Gilbert Seary Puff (N346PE) on San Juan Island west of Friday Harbor Airport in Friday Harbor, Washington. He is piloting the plane at the time.

September
1 September
Heavy fighting takes place between Syrian government and rebel forces at the Syrian Air Force college at Rasm al-Abud and at the Syrian Air Force base at Abu al-Duhur, and rebel forces overrun a government air defense building in Deir ez-zor.

2 September
An American airstrike hoping to kill the senior regional al-Qaeda leader Abdelrauf al-Dahab, thought to be traveling by car on a road in Rada'a, Yemen, instead hits a pickup truck loaded with 14 innocent people, killing 12 of them. The Government of Yemen accepts blame for the mistake.

5 September
 Wearing a white costume designed to induce endangered Siberian cranes to follow him, President of Russia Vladimir Putin pilots a motorized hang glider in three brief flights over Russias Yamal Peninsula in the Arctic, apparently the first time a Russian head of state has piloted an aircraft. Cranes follow him on two of the flights. His flights are part of the "Flight of Hope" project to increase the population of Siberian cranes by using ultralight aircraft to lead the birds on flights that teach them to migrate.

11 September
 The Malaysian low-cost airline Malindo Air is founded. It will begin flight operations in March 2013.

12 September
 Petropavlovsk-Kamchatsky Air Flight 251, an Antonov An-28, crashes while attempting to land at Palana Airport outside Palana, Russia, killing 10 of the 14 people on board and seriously injuring all four survivors.

13 September
 A Syrian Air Force strike in Aleppo kills 11 people.

14 September
 Yousef Assad, a high-ranking Syrian Air Force officer and relative of Syrian President Bashar al-Assad, announces his defection to the opposition in an online video.

20 September
At least 71 people die in Raqqa, Syria, when a Syrian Air Force plane bombs a gasoline (petrol) station.
After takeoff from Damascus International Airport in Damascus, Syria, a Syrian Air Airbus A320 collides in mid-air with a Syrian Mil Mi-17 (NATO reporting name "Hip") helicopter. The helicopter crashes, while the A320 returns to the airport safely despite a damaged tail.

21 September
 A Syrian Air Force jet reportedly is shot down by rebel forces over Atarib, Syria.
 A Space Shuttle is airborne for the last time as a Shuttle Carrier Aircraft completes a three-day journey to transport the retired Space Shuttle Endeavour from Cape Canaveral, Florida, to Los Angeles, California. After two days of delays due to bad weather, the aircraft had departed Cape Canaveral on 19 September and made low passes over Floridas Space Coast and National Aeronautics and Space Administration (NASA) centers in Mississippi and Louisiana before spending the night at Ellington Field in Houston, Texas; proceeded on 20 September to El Paso, Texas, for a refueling stop before flying over the White Sands Test Facility in New Mexico and over Tucson, Arizona, in tribute to retired Congresswoman Gabby Giffords, ending the day with an overnight stop at Edwards Air Force Base in California; and on 21 September had completed the final leg of the journey by making low-level passes over Sacramento, San Francisco, Silicon Valley, and Los Angeles, California, before landing at Los Angeles International Airport.

22 September
A diamond formation involving 100 jumpers over Perris, California, sets a global record for the largest formation wingsuit jump. However, the record is set prior to the February 2015 establishment of judging criteria for official world record wingsuit formations by the Fédération Aéronautique Internationale, and therefore will be retired, with records thereafter being recognized under the new criteria.

25 September
 The People's Republic of China commissions its first aircraft carrier, Liaoning, at Dalian Port, China.

28 September
 Sita Air Flight 601, a Dornier 228 carrying British, Chinese, and Nepalese trekkers to the Mount Everest region, strikes a bird shortly after takeoff from Tribhuvan International Airport in Kathmandu, Nepal, crashes on the bank of the Manohara River at Madhyapur Thimi  short of the runway while attempting to return to the airport, and burns. All 19 people on board die. It is the seventh fatal air crash in Nepal since August 2010.

30 September
 U.S. airlines have collected US$924 million in baggage fees since 1 July, a three percent increase over the same period in 2011.

October

1 October
 The first six of a planned 12 United States Marine Corps MV-22 Osprey aircraft transfer from Marine Corps Air Station Iwakuni, Japan, to their new base at Marine Corps Air Station Futenma on Okinawa. Hundreds of people gather outside MCAS Futenma to protest their arrival, believing that the crashes of Ospreys in Morocco and Florida earlier in the year and a precautionary landing by an Osprey in North Carolina in September demonstrate that Osprey operations will endanger the residential neighborhoods that surround the base.
 In Thailand, Thai AirAsia transfers all of its operations in Bangkok from Suvarnabhumi Airport to Don Mueang International Airport. It previously had been the only airline offering low-cost domestic and international service at Suvarnabhumi Airport.

7 October
FlyMontserrat Flight 107, the Britten-Norman Islander VP-NOM, crashes shortly after takeoff from V. C. Bird International Airport on Antigua, killing three of the four people on board and injuring the lone survivor. It is the deadliest air accident in the history of Antigua and Barbuda.

10 October
As part of an arms embargo against Syria, Turkish Air Force F-16 Fighting Falcons intercept Syrian Air Flight RB442, an Airbus A320 suspected of carrying Russian-made weapons, in Turkish airspace during its flight from Vnukovo International Airport in Moscow to Damascus International Airport in Damascus, Syria, and force it to land at Esenboğa International Airport outside Ankara, Turkey. Inspectors confiscate military communications equipment and items "thought to be missile parts" found aboard the plane.

11 October
Indonesia AirAsia announces the cancellation of its plan to buy out Batavia Air.
The Syrian Revolution General Commission claims that its forces have destroyed 61 Syrian government helicopters and planes, mostly while on the ground during rebel raids, and that the heaviest Syrian government aircraft losses occurred in August.

13 October
Syria bans Turkish civilian aircraft from flying over its territory.

14 October
Human Rights Watch accuses the Syrian government of using Russian-made cluster bombs in air attacks on populated areas and near key battlefields.
Turkey closes its airspace to Syrian civilian flights.
 In the Red Bull Stratos project, Austrian Felix Baumgartner balloon altitude record, ascending to 38,969 meters (127,851 feet) near Roswell, New Mexico. He then sets a new height record for a parachute jump, diving from a capsule suspended beneath the balloon at an altitude of 128,097 feet (39,044 meters; 24.26 miles; 39.04 km). The 9-minute descent includes a 4-minute-20-second free fall of 119,846 feet (36,530 meters; 22.7 miles; 36.5 km), during which he reaches Mach 1.24 (833.9 mph; 1,342.8 km/hr), becoming the first person to exceed the speed of sound without travelling in a jet aircraft or spacecraft. He lands standing up. He breaks the skydiving altitude record set on 16 August 1960 by U.S. Air Force Colonel Joseph Kittinger, who serves as Baumgartners capsule communicator during the jump.

15 October
 Towed through the streets of Los Angeles, California, the retired Space Shuttle Endeavour completes a  journey from Los Angeles International Airport to the California Science Center for museum display. Endeavour had left the airport on 12 October, and numerous logistical problems along the route cause it to arrive at the science center 17 hours late.

18 October
Syrian Air Force jets destroy two residential buildings and a mosque in the rebel-held town of Maarrat al-Nu'man, reportedly killing at least 44 people.

20 October
India's Kingfisher Airlines suspends flight operations due to financial difficulties.
The Syrian Expatriates Organization claims that a combination of Syrian government airstrikes and a military blockade over the previous 130 days have destroyed 75 percent of the city of Deir ez-zor, Syria, killing over 3,000 people and causing 380,000 to flee the city.

25 October
 Independent United Nations human rights researcher Ben Emmerson announces plans to launch an investigation into unmanned aerial vehicle strikes and other targeted assassinations by governments that kill or injure civilians.

28 October
Syrian Air Force aircraft strike rebel-held areas in the eastern Damascus suburbs of Arbeen, Harasta, and Zamalka.

30 October
The Syrian Air Force carries out scores of airstrikes around Syria, the most widespread bombing in a single day since the Syrian Civil War began 19 months before, according to anti-government activists. Maarat al-Numan is among the hardest-hit places, and air strikes level areas of Douma, leaving 18 people dead.
Syrian Air Force Major General Abdullah Mahmoud al-Khalidi is assassinated in Damascus, Syria.

November
2 November
 According to the Local Coordination Committees of Syria, Syrian Air Force strikes on Harem, Syria, kill 70 people.
 The Space Shuttle Atlantis is towed from the Vehicle Assembly Building at the Kennedy Space Center in Cape Canaveral, Florida, to an exhibition hall at Cape Canaverals main tourist stop to be put on display. The 10-mile (16-km) journey takes 12 hours. It is the final act of the Space Shuttle Program.

3 November
 Syrian rebel units attack the Syrian Air Force base at Taftanaz.

14 November
 Israel begins Operation Pillar of Defense by launching its most intense air attacks against Hamas forces in the Gaza Strip since 2008, killing the Hamas defense chief in Gaza, Ahmed al-Jabari, and striking dozens of targets before dark.

15 November
 Israeli aircraft strike 70 underground rocket-launching sites in the Gaza Strip in 60 minutes.

17 November
 Israel expands its air campaign in the Gaza Strip to target Hamas government buildings, destroying the offices of Ismail Haniyeh, the Prime Minister of the Palestinian National Authority in Gaza. Israeli airstrikes increase to nearly 200 early in the day.
 Syrian rebels capture a Syrian government air base near rebel-held Abu Kamal, Syrian, meaning that the only air base the Syrian government holds in the Deiz ez-zor region is the main one near the city of Deiz ez-zor itself.
 United Nations attack helicopters strike rebel positions south of Kibumba in North Kivu province in the eastern Democratic Republic of the Congo.

21 November
 A ceasefire brings fighting in the Gaza Strip between Israel and Hamas to an end.
 While JetBlue Flight 1329, an Embraer E190, taxis to its gate after landing at Baltimore-Washington International Airport in Anne Arundel County, Maryland, a fire breaks out in one of its engines. After the airliner reaches its gate, everyone on board evacuates the plane uninjured via the jetway while firefighters douse the fire.

23 November
 The People's Republic of China conducts its first carrier flight operations with fixed-wing aircraft, when the People's Liberation Army Navy aircraft carrier Liaoning launches and recovers the Shenyang J-15 fighter for the first time.

25 November
 Syrian rebel forces attack a Syrian government airbase  outside Damascus, and claim to have destroyed two helicopters on the ground.

26 November
 The U.S. Navy begins testing of the Northrop Grumman X-47B unmanned combat aerial vehicle aboard the aircraft carrier . By the time the testing period ends on 18 December, the X-47B will have made a number of successful test launches and recoveries.

29 November
 Fighting between government and rebel forces near Damascus International Airport in Damascus, Syria, closes the road to the airport. The airline Emirates suspends flights to Damascus, and an Egyptian airliner that has landed at Damascus International as scheduled and discharged its passengers safely is ordered to take off and return to Cairo without passengers if its pilot feels the situation is too dangerous to allow the plane to stay long enough to embark its passengers for the return flight.
 The U.S. Navy successfully conducts the first land-based catapult launch of the Northrop Grumman X-47B unmanned combat aerial vehicle at Naval Air Station Patuxent River, Maryland.

30 November
 An Aéro-Service (initially mistakenly attributed to Trans Air Congo) Ilyushin Il-76T (registration number EK-76300) on a domestic cargo flight in the Republic of the Congo from Pointe Noire to Brazzaville crashes short of Runway 5L in a residential area while attempting to land in bad weather at Maya-Maya Airport in Brazzaville. All six crew members – five of whom are from Armenia – and one police officer on board the aircraft and 26 people on the ground are killed, and 14 people on the ground are injured.

December
During the month, Iran claims to have seized three American ScanEagle unmanned aerial vehicles that violated its airspace.

1 December
 Syrian rebels credit one rebel soldier trained in the use of 9K38 Igla (NATO reporting name "SA-16 Gimlet") surface-to-air missiles captured from the Syrian government with using the missiles to shoot down two Syrian Army helicopters on consecutive days.

2 December
 Syrian Air Force jets pound rebel-held suburbs around Damascus, killing and wounding dozens in an offensive to push rebels away from the Damascus International Airport and stop them from closing in on the capital.
 Syria announces that Damascus International Airport has reopened and is running scheduled flights after being closed for three days due to fighting between government and rebel forces in the area.

3 December
 Egyptair orders a Cairo, Egypt-to-Damascus, Syria, flight to turn back in mid-air because of concerns over the security situation around Damascus International Airport.

4 December
 The North Atlantic Treaty Organization (NATO) approves the deployment of MIM-104 Patriot surface-to-air missiles in a -wide zone along Turkeys border with Syria.

7 December
 A missile fired by an American unmanned aerial vehicle strikes a house near Mir Ali in North Waziristan, Pakistan, killing senior al-Qaeda leader Sheik Khalid Bin Abdel Rehman Al-Hussainan, also known as Abu-Zaid al Kuwaiti, while he is eating breakfast. The attack also mortally wounds his wife, and injures his daughter.

9 December
 An American unmanned aerial vehicle fires a missile into a house in Tabbi in North Waziristan, Pakistan, killing the al-Qaeda commander Mohammad Ahmed al-Mansoor.

13 December
 The Japan Air Self-Defense Force scrambles four Mitsubishi F-15 fighters to intercept a People's Republic of China Harbin Y-12 seen flying over the Senkaku Islands (known as Diaoyu in Chinese), which both countries claim as their territory. The Y-12 departs before the F-15s arrive over the islands.

15 December
 Ten Tehrik-i-Taliban Pakistan members attack Bacha Khan International Airport in Peshawar, Pakistan, with rocket-propelled grenades and automatic weapons, targeting Pakistani military facilities where attack helicopters are based and triggering a gun battle of over an hour with Pakistani security forces during which five of the attackers are killed. Three grenades strike airport property and two more land in adjacent neighborhoods. Four residents of the neighborhoods are killed and 30 to 40 injured. The five surviving attackers all are cornered and killed by Pakistani police the following day.

20 December
 Syrian Air Force aircraft drop cluster bombs onto neighborhoods and homes in Mare', Syria. A local hospital reports four dead and 23 wounded.

21 December
 The Republic of South Sudans Sudan People's Liberation Army shoots down a United Nations helicopter on a reconnaissance flight over Jonglei in South Sudan, killing its entire four-man Russian crew. South Sudan at first denies shooting the helicopter down, then expresses regret for the incident, saying its forces had shot the helicopter down after mistaking it for a plane from Sudan flying supplies in to rebels in Jonglei.

23 December
 Over a period of 17 minutes, three waves of Syrian Air Force aircraft attack the only bakery operating in Halfaya, Syria, where hundreds of people had gathered to buy the first fresh bread available in the area for days, killing dozens. Opposition groups estimate the number of dead at anywhere from fewer than 100 to as many as 300 people.

24 December
 An American unmanned aerial vehicle strike in eastern Yemen kills five al-Qaeda in the Arabian Peninsula members riding motorcycles in the city of Shehr, including Abdullah Bawazir and Nabil al Kaldi. Another strike kills two other members of the group in the central Yemeni city of Rada'a.

25 December
 The crew of an Air Bagan Fokker 100 with 71 people on board for a domestic flight in Burma from Rangoon to Heho via Mandalay mistakes a road for the runway while descending to land at Heho in heavy fog, hits power lines, and crash-lands either on the road or in a nearby rice paddy and burns, killing a tour guide and injuring eleven other people aboard the plane. A man on the ground riding a bicycle also is killed.
The acting Director of the Kazakhstan Border Guard Service, Colonel Turganbeck Stambekov, is among the dead, along with one of his deputies and a number of regional Border Guard commanders.

27 December
 Syrian rebel forces claim to have shot down a Syrian Air Force MiG in western Syria near Morek with antiaircraft artillery fire.

28 December
 Press observers begin to observe daily Myanmar Air Force strikes against rebel Kachin Independence Army forces in northern Myanmar. The strikes reportedly will continue into early January 2013.
 Syrian rebels increase pressure against a government helicopter base and fight with government soldiers near Aleppo International Airport as they continue their offensive against government airbases. They claim to have surrounded four airports and airbases in the Aleppo Governorate, halting all activity at one and firing antiaircraft artillery at all approaching aircraft at another.
 The Syrian Air Force strikes al-Safira, killing 14 people.
 An airstike kills two suspected al-Qaeda members in Hadramawt province in southwestern Yemen. Local residents and Yemeni officials claim an American unmanned aerial vehicle conducted the strike.

29 December
 Red Wings Airlines Flight 9268, Tupolev Tu-204-100B RA-64047, arriving from Pardubice Airport at Pardubice in the Czech Republic at the end of a repositioning flight with a crew of eight and no passengers on board, overruns the runway on landing at Vnukovo International Airport in Moscow, Russia, crosses partly onto a highway, crashes into a ditch, breaks into three pieces, and catches fire, killing five crew members and critically injuring all three survivors.
 Syrian Air cancels a flight to Aleppo, Syria, because of fighting between government and rebel forces near Aleppo International Airport.
 An airstrike, suspected of being by an American unmanned aerial vehicle, destroys a Toyota Land Cruiser outside Rada'a in southern Yemen, killing three al-Qaeda members in the vehicle and prompting dozens of al-Qaeda members to protest.
 Aerosvit Airlines files for bankruptcy. It will cease operations in April 2013.

30 December
 Myanmar Air Force jets and attack helicopters strike rebel Kachin Independence Army forces in northern Myanmar. The Government of Myanmar at first denies the strikes, but eventually will admit to them on 2 January 2013.

31 December
 The Kachin Independence Army again claims to be under attack by Myanmar Air Force aircraft.
 Aleppo International Airport is closed due to fighting between Syrian government and rebel forces around the base of the Syrian Army force protecting the airport.
 Airlines in the United States have collected over $6,000,000,000 in baggage fees from passengers in 2012, the highest yearly total since the fees became common in 2008.

First flights

March
 9 March – Cessna Citation M2

April
3 April – Diamond DA52

May
10 May – AgustaWestland AW169 I-EASF

June
1 June – Boeing Phantom Eye

July
 e-volo VC2

September
 21 September – Sukhoi Su-30SM

October
 31 October – Shenyang J-31

November
 27 November – Embraer Legacy 500 PT-ZEX

December
1 December – Dassault nEUROn

Entered service
 1 June – Boeing 747-8 Intercontinental with Lufthansa.

Retirements

February
 8 February
 Shuttle Carrier Aircraft N911A by the National Aeronautics and Space Administration (NASA); the aircraft was retired to the aircraft boneyard at Mojave Air and Space Port in California for use as a source of spare parts for NASAs Stratospheric Observatory for Infrared Astronomy (SOFIA) aircraft.

September
24 September
 Shuttle Carrier Aircraft N905A by NASA; found to have few parts useful for the SOFIA aircraft, N905A is later earmarked for museum display at the Johnson Space Center in Houston, Texas.

References

 
Aviation by year